The 2010–11 EHF Cup season, Frisch Auf Göppingen won the Europe's club handball tournament.

Knockout stage

Round 1

Round 1

|}

Round 2

Round 3

Round of 16

Knockout stage

Quarterfinals

Semifinals

Finals

|}

References

External links 
 EHF Cup website

EHF Cup seasons
Champions League
Champions League